This is a list of equipment of the Saudi Arabian Army currently in service.

Small arms

Artillery

Vehicles

Aviation

References 

 
Saudi
Equipment